This is a list of '''UT Martin Skyhawks football players in the NFL Draft.

Key

Selections
Source:

References

Lists of National Football League draftees by college football team

UT Martin Skyhawks NFL Draft